is a junction passenger railway station located in the city of Kokubunji, Tokyo, Japan, operated by East Japan Railway Company (JR East).

Lines
It is 32.8 kilometers from the terminus of the Chūō Line at Tokyo Station and 3.9 kilometers from the starting point of the Musashino Line at Fuchūhommachi.

Station layout

The station consists of two side platforms serving two tracks at ground level for the Chūō Line (Rapid), and two elevated side platforms at right angles to these serving two tracks for the Musashino Line. A third track lies between these two tracks for use by non-stop freight trains.

The station has a "Midori no Madoguchi" staffed ticket office.

Platforms

History
The station opened on 1 April 1973. With the privatization of Japanese National Railways (JNR) on 1 April 1987, the station came under the control of JR East.

Passenger statistics
In fiscal 2019, the station was used by an average of 29,577 passengers daily (boarding passengers only). The passenger figures for previous years are as shown below.

Surrounding area
 Musashi Kokubunji Park
 Tokyo Metropolitan Neurological Hospital

See also

 List of railway stations in Japan

References

External links

  

Railway stations in Japan opened in 1973
Chūō Main Line
Stations of East Japan Railway Company
Railway stations in Tokyo
Musashino Line
Kokubunji, Tokyo